Tony Fruscella (February 4, 1927 – August 14, 1969) was an American jazz trumpeter.

Biography 
Tony Fruscella and his sister Maria, grew up in Greenwich Village, Manhattan, New York. He played in an Army band early in his career. He worked as a sideman in the 1950s for Charlie Barnet, Lester Young, Gerry Mulligan (1954), and Stan Getz(1955). He played with Don Joseph later in the 1950s, but by the early 1960s his problems with drug abuse and alcoholism prevented him from performing. Fruscella released one album, I'll Be Seeing You (1955), as a leader during his lifetime. It was recorded with Allen Eager and Danny Bank) for Atlantic Records.

He was married to singer Morgana King. The marriage ended in divorce after nine years.

Discography 
 Tony Fruscella (Atlantic, 1955) 
 Fru'n Brew with Brew Moore (Spotlite, 1981) 
 Debut (Spotlite, 1981) 
 The 1954 Unissued Atlantic Session (Fresh Sound, 2011)

Notes 
Harrison, Max. Modern Jazz, The Essential Records, A Critical Selection (1975) pp. 61 – 
Yanow, Scott. The Trumpet Kings, The Players Who Shaped the Sound of Jazz Trumpet (2001) pp. 162 – 
Kerouac, Jack. Lonesome Traveler (fiction) 1989 – Page 115 – 
Stan Getz: Nobody Else But Me by Dave Gelly (2002) pp. 68 – 
Fifties Jazz Talk: An Oral Retrospective by Jack Gordon (2004) pp. 71- 
The Biographical Encyclopedia of Jazz by Leonard Feather, Ira Gitler (2007) pp. 76 – 
The Jazz Discography by Tom Lord (1993) 
The Penguin Guide to Jazz by Richard Cook, Brian Morton (2002) pp. 536 –

References

External links 
Tony Fruscella at Jazz Discography

1927 births
1969 deaths
American jazz trumpeters
American male trumpeters
Musicians from New York (state)
Xanadu Records artists
People from Orangeburg, New York
20th-century American musicians
20th-century trumpeters
Jazz musicians from New York (state)
20th-century American male musicians
American male jazz musicians